The Yalta Raion was an administrative division (a district) of the Crimean Autonomous Soviet Socialist Republic and later the Crimean Oblast as part of the Russian Soviet Federative Socialist Republic until it was reorganized into the Yalta municipality in 1948.

See also
 Administrative divisions of Crimea

Yalta Municipality
History of Crimea